Dong Hang (born 21 May 1993) is a Chinese footballer currently playing as a goalkeeper for Beijing BSU.

Career statistics

Club
.

References

1993 births
Living people
Chinese footballers
China youth international footballers
Association football goalkeepers
China League Two players
China League One players
Shanghai Shenhua F.C. players
Beijing Sport University F.C. players